Refuge du Couvercle is a refuge in the Alps.

External links

Mountain huts in the Alps
Mountain huts in France